Lockhartia, abbreviated Lhta. in the horticultural trade, is a genus of orchids (family Orchidaceae) and the only genus of alliance Lockhartia. There are about 30 species, distributed from Mexico through northern South America, as well as in Trinidad.

List of species 
Species accepted as of June 2014
 Lockhartia acuta (Lindl.) Rchb.f.
 Lockhartia amoena Endres & Rchb.f.
 Lockhartia bennettii Dodson
 Lockhartia chocoensis Kraenzl.
 Lockhartia dipleura Schltr.
 Lockhartia galeottiana Soto Arenas
 Lockhartia genegeorgei D.E.Benn. & Christenson
 Lockhartia goyazensis Rchb.f.
 Lockhartia hercodonta Rchb.f. ex Kraenzl.
 Lockhartia imbricata (Lam.) Hoehne
 Lockhartia ivainae M.F.F.Silva & A.T.Oliveira
 Lockhartia latilabris C.Schweinf.
 Lockhartia lepticaula D.E.Benn. & Christenson
 Lockhartia longifolia (Lindl.) Schltr.
 Lockhartia ludibunda Rchb.f.
 Lockhartia lunifera (Lindl.) Rchb.f.
 Lockhartia micrantha Rchb.f.
 Lockhartia niesseniae Kolan. & O.Pérez
 Lockhartia oblongicallosa Carnevali & G.A.Romero
 Lockhartia obtusata L.O.Williams
 Lockhartia odontochila Kraenzl.
 Lockhartia oerstedii Rchb.f.
 Lockhartia parthenocomos (Rchb.f.) Rchb.f.
 Lockhartia pittieri Schltr.
 Lockhartia schunkei D.E.Benn. & Christenson
 Lockhartia serra Rchb.f.
 Lockhartia triangulabia Ames & C.Schweinf.
 Lockhartia tuberculata D.E.Benn. & Christenson
 Lockhartia variabilis Ames & C.Schweinf.
 Lockhartia viruensis E.M.Pessoa & M.Alves

References

External links 

 
Oncidiinae genera